2 Close Support Battalion REME is a battalion of the Royal Electrical and Mechanical Engineers of the British Army.

History
The battalion was formed in 1993, through the re-designation of 7 Armoured Workshop, at St Barbara Barracks, Fallingbostel. The battalion's initial role was supporting 7th Armoured Brigade, just like its predecessor unit did. 

Under the Future Soldier reforms, the battalion is due to be re-designated as 2 Force Support Battalion, and transfer from the close support to the divisional support role.

Structure
The battalion's current structure is as follows:
7 Close Support Company
11 Close Support Company

References

Battalions of the Royal Electrical and Mechanical Engineers
Military units and formations established in 1993